Sidney George "Sid" Gibson (20 May 1899 – 5 July 1938) was an English footballer who played as an outside right. Born in Walgrave, Northamptonshire he played for Nottingham Forest and Sheffield United in the Football League before becoming a scout in later life.

Career

Playing career
Gibson began his playing career with Kettering Town before signing for Nottingham Forest for £500 in October 1921. Making his Football League debut a few days later in an away-fixture at West Ham United, Gibson went on to become a regular in the Forest side for six seasons, making 252 league appearances and winning a Second Division championship medal in the 1921–22 season.

Gibson signed for Sheffield United shortly after the start of the 1928–29 season as a replacement for David Mercer. United paid £5,000 for Gibson, a record fee for both clubs at the time, but he failed to live up to expectations and it appeared he was past his prime. His inconsistency and lack of confidence led to criticism from the club's supporters during games, but despite this Gibson went on to make 118 appearances for the Blades, scoring 29 goals. A serious knee injury sustained in a game against Derby County in January 1932 was quickly followed by further knee problems and Gibson was forced to retire from playing at the age of 33.

Post playing career
Gibson received £350 from the Football League as compensation for his retirement and was granted a benefit match against Sheffield Wednesday by United. Having retired from playing Gibson returned to football in January 1935 when he was appointed assistant manager and scout for Southend United. A spell as chief scout at West Ham United followed in 1937, where Gibson was still employed when he died in 1938.

Personal life
Born in Walgrave, Northamptonshire, Gibson was regarded as an accomplished pianist and church organist.

References

1899 births
1938 deaths
People from West Northamptonshire District
English footballers
Association football forwards
Kettering Town F.C. players
Nottingham Forest F.C. players
Sheffield United F.C. players
English Football League players
West Ham United F.C. non-playing staff